The Alaska Native Allotment Act of 1906, enacted on May 17, 1906, permitted individual Alaska Natives to acquire title to up to  of land in a manner similar to that afforded to Native Americans. The 1906 Allotment Act was repealed in 1971, when the Alaska Native Claims Settlement Act was passed.

See also
 Alaska Native Claims Settlement Act
 Outline of United States federal Indian law and policy

References
Sources
 Case, David S. and David A. Voluck. (2002). Alaska Natives and American Laws, 2nd ed. Fairbanks, AK: University of Alaska Press.
 "Early Alaska Native Land Cases and Acts | Federal Indian Law for Alaska Tribes". 
 www.uaf.edu. Retrieved 2021-11-10.
 "Programs: Lands and Realty: Alaska: Land Transfer: Alaska Native Allotment Act | Bureau of Land Management". www.blm.gov. Retrieved 2021-11-25.

Citations

www.uaf.edu.

1906 in Alaska
1906 in law
Alaska Natives and United States law
Legal history of Alaska
United States federal Native American legislation
Repealed United States legislation